Biskupice (before 1927 Pišpeky, 1773 Filakowska) is a village and municipality in the Lučenec District in the Banská Bystrica Region of Slovakia.

History
The village arose in the 12th century; it was first mentioned in records in 1294, when it belonged to the Esztergom Archbishopric.

Genealogical resources

The records for genealogical research are available at the state archive "Statny Archiv in Banska Bystrica, Slovakia"

 Roman Catholic church records (births/marriages/deaths): 1785-1897 (parish A)
 Greek Catholic church records (births/marriages/deaths): 1775-1928 (parish B)

See also
 List of municipalities and towns in Slovakia

External links
 https://web.archive.org/web/20080111223415/http://www.statistics.sk/mosmis/eng/run.html
 http://www.e-obce.sk/obec/biskupice/biskupice.html

 Surnames of living people in Biskupice

Villages and municipalities in Lučenec District